Felix Riesenberg (9 April 1879 – 19 November 1939) was an American maritime officer and writer of maritime professional, historical, and fictional literature in the early 20th century.

Biography

Riesenberg was born in Milwaukee, Wisconsin.   He later attended the New York Nautical School graduating in the class of 1897.  Afterward, he secured a position as a deck officer in the merchant marine, being part of the Coast and Geodetic Survey and also serving in the Naval Reserve until 1909.  Riesenberg was hired by Walter Wellman to be a part of the support crew in an unsuccessful attempt to reach the North Pole by airship in the summer of 1906. He was rehired by Wellman the following year to be the navigator aboard the three man airship America in a second failed attempt to reach the North Pole in 1907.

After this, Riesenberg enrolled and graduated from the Columbia School of Engineering and Applied Science in 1913.

Riesenberg worked as a civil Engineer for New York State from 1913 to 1915 and then again from 1920 to 1922.  In the interim, he was the Chief Officer of the United States Shipping Board.

Riesenberg was the superintendent of the New York Nautical School on two occasions, from 1917 to 1919 as Commander of the barkentine "Newport" and again from 1923 to 1924.

Riesenberg was also a prolific author, publishing a textbook, Standard Seamanship for the Merchant Service that became commonly used, as well as several maritime historical works and novels.  He wrote several articles that appeared in the magazine The Nation. Riesenberg published his memoir Living Again in 1937.

Riesenberg died 19 November 1939 in Scarsdale, New York.  After a funeral service held in Bronxville his ashes were scattered at sea.

He had four children, Felix Jr., William, Margaret (Peggy), and John (Jack). Priscilla was Felix Jr's wife.  His son Felix Jr. (1913–1962) was also an author of numerous maritime books.

The New York Nautical School is today called "Maritime College" and is part of the State University of New York (SUNY) system.  Present day cadets are still taught the 'Riesenberg Saying': "The sea is selective; slow at recognition of effort and aptitude, but fast in sinking the unfit."

Selected bibliography
 Under Sail: A Boy's Voyage Around Cape Horn - 1918
 Standard Seamanship for the Merchant Service - 1922
 Bob Graham at Sea - 1925
 Vignettes of the Sea - 1926
 East Side, West Side - 1927, turned into a film of the same name also released in 1927
 Red Horses - 1928
 Shipmates: Sketches of the Sea - 1928
 Endless River - 1931
 The Maiden Voyage - 1931
 Passing Strangers - 1931
 Skyline - 1931, a film screenplay also based upon the 1927 novel East Side, West Side
 Mother Sea - 1933
 Log of the Sea - 1933
 The Left-Handed Passenger - 1935
 Living Again : an Autobiography - 1937
 Cape Horn : the story of the Cape Horn region, including the straits of Magellan, from the days - 1939
 The Pacific Ocean - 1940 (published posthumously)

Honors
The  was a type EC2-S-C1 Liberty ship built at Brunswick, Georgia and delivered to the United States Merchant Marine 26 December 1944 that was named in Riesenberg's honor.
Following World War II she was sold to a private company in 1947 and finally scrapped in 1972.

In the 1940s, a sail training schooner at the United States Merchant Marine Academy in King's Point, New York was renamed the Felix Riesenberg, having previously been named the Rhine.

On the campus of State University of New York Maritime College Riesenberg Hall, which houses the athletic department, was dedicated 6 May 1965 to honor Riesenberg.  Riesenberg Hall contains a gymnasium and a natatorium, it hosts the college's basketball, volleyball, and swimming & diving events.

In 2001, Felix Riesenberg was inducted into the National Maritime Hall of Fame at Kings Point.

References

External links
 

1879 births
1939 deaths
Presidents of the State University of New York Maritime College
Writers from Milwaukee
People from Scarsdale, New York
Columbia School of Engineering and Applied Science alumni
United States Merchant Mariners
American sailors
American maritime historians
20th-century American memoirists
American male screenwriters
American explorers
Burials at sea
American historians
American male non-fiction writers
Screenwriters from New York (state)
Screenwriters from Wisconsin
20th-century American male writers
20th-century American screenwriters